Carex ecklonii is a tussock-forming species of perennial sedge in the family Cyperaceae. It is native to parts of the Cape Province of South Africa.

See also
List of Carex species

References

ecklonii
Plants described in 1835
Taxa named by Christian Gottfried Daniel Nees von Esenbeck
Flora of the Cape Provinces